Esher is a town in Surrey, England. It can also mean:

Surrey, England
 Esher College, a college in Thames Ditton
 Esher Commons, several large wooded areas to the south-west of Esher
 Esher (UK Parliament constituency)
 Esher and Walton (UK Parliament constituency)
 Esher News & Mail
 Esher railway station
 Esher RFC, a rugby union club

People with the surname Esher
 Viscount Esher, a Peerage title of Esher, Surrey, England, held by:
William Brett, 1st Viscount Esher (1815–1899)
Reginald Brett, 2nd Viscount Esher (1852–1930)
Oliver Balliol Brett, 3rd Viscount Esher (1881–1963)
Lionel Brett, 4th Viscount Esher (1913–2004)
Christopher Brett, 5th Viscount Esher (born 1936); see Viscount Esher
Richard Drake of Esher, Surrey, (1535–1603)

Other uses
 Esher Township, Quebec, Canada, part of Sheenboro, Quebec
 Esher Report, of 1904
 Esher (Myst), a character from the video game Myst V: End of Ages

See also 
Escher, a surname